Below are list of Tamil language media in Malaysia

Tamil Television Station
Tamil language channel in Malaysia can be divided into 2, Channel that air fully  programmers in Tamil or other Indian Language and channels and partly in Tamil.

Program fully in Tamil

References

Tamil-language television channels